Richard Horwood (1757/8 – 3 October 1803) was a surveyor and cartographer. He is mainly remembered for his large-scale plan of London and its suburbs published in 32 sheets between 1792 and 1799. He also published a plan of Liverpool in six sheets in 1803.

Map of London
Between 1792 and 1799 Horwood published a Plan of the Cities of London and Westminster the Borough of Southwark and Parts adjoining Shewing every House. At the time this was the largest map ever printed in Britain. After he decided to chart the entire city of London, down to each individual building, Horwood set about soliciting subscriptions to finance the project in 1790. His intention was to publish the complete map within two years, at a scale of 26 inches to the mile. However, the scope of the project was so extensive, and his cost to complete it so high, that rather than taking the estimated two years, the project took almost ten to complete. Despite acquiring royal patronage from King George III, the project suffered financial hardship, making it even more difficult to produce. However, Horwood eventually published the entire map, consisting of 32 sheets (four rows of eight columns). The last sheet was made available in 1799.

In 1800 he wrote of the map, in a letter to the Society for the Encouragement of Arts, Manufacture and Commerce:

Map of Liverpool
Horwood also published a similar large-scale plan of Liverpool, in six sheets, in July 1803.

He died on 3 October 1803 in Liverpool, and was buried in Toxteth Unitarian Chapel.

Legacy
After Horwood's death, the 32 plates of his London map passed to the cartographer and a publisher William Faden. Faden published three further revised and updated editions of the map, under Horwood's name and still fundamentally his work, in 1807, 1813 and 1819.

In 1985 a reduced facsimile edition of the 1813 map was published in volume format by Harry Margary in association with the Guildhall Library, with a superimposed grid, full place-name index, and introductory notes by Paul Laxton, under the title The A to Z of Regency London.

Sections of the 1813 edition are reproduced in Charles Palliser's novel The Quincunx (1989). The story is set a few years after the publication of the map, which is used by one of the characters.

A selection of the Horwood maps were used in the publication of Timbuctoo, a novel based on the adventures of Robert Adams, which includes five large fold-out maps of London.

References

Bibliography

External links

British Library Online Gallery: London Westminster Southwark and parts adjoining by R. Horwood 1795

MOTCO Enterprises: Horwood map of London Westminster Southwark and parts adjoining 1792–9 (detailed freely-searchable map; site defunct as of 9 March 2017)
Romantic London Project overlaying the map with 18th century data.

1750s births
1803 deaths
English cartographers
18th-century cartographers
Publishers (people) from London